The Old West Church is a historic United Methodist Church at 131 Cambridge Street in the West End of Boston, Massachusetts.  It was built in 1806 to designs by architect Asher Benjamin, and is considered one of his finest works. It is a monumentally-scaled example of ecclesiastical Federal architecture, whose design was widely copied throughout New England.

Description and history
The first church on this site was built in 1737 as a wood-frame building, and was occupied as a barracks by British troops during their occupation of the city prior to the American Revolution. The British destroyed its tower in 1775 when they suspected that American Colonials were signaling to Cambridge from the spire.

In 1806 the congregation commissioned Asher Benjamin to design a new church building. As in the architect's earlier Charles Street Meeting House (1804), its -story brick entry tower is crowned with a cupola; the whole tower projects outward somewhat from the church hall behind. Four shallow brick pilasters, each two stories high and trimmed with white wood, separate the three entry doors. Each door is echoed by a window above it. The tower's third story is outfitted with pairs of Doric pilasters. On the final half-story beneath the cupola are clocks on each face of the tower, each adorned with a light swag. On the back wall, the original central pulpit window has been filled in with brickwork.

Old West's preaching played a major role in American history. Jonathan Mayhew, the church's second Congregational pastor, spoke out as early as 1750 about the justice of removing tyrannical leaders. His preaching was theologically radical as well, and is held by some Unitarians to have predated William Ellery Channing in his exposition of anti-trinitarian views. By the early 19th century, the resultant Unitarianism had converted 9 of Boston's original 13 orthodox Congregational churches. Other notable pastors included Charles Lowell, and Cyrus Augustus Bartol.

The church was originally and for 150 years Congregational. Between 1894 and 1960 the building served as a branch of the Boston Public Library. Since 1961, the building has been owned by the United Methodist Church. 

The building was designated a National Historic Landmark in 1970 for its architectural significance.

Gallery

See also
List of National Historic Landmarks in Boston
National Register of Historic Places listings in northern Boston, Massachusetts

References

Further reading
 Nancy S. Voye. Asher Benjamin's West Church: A Model for Change. Old-Time New England v.67, no.245, Summer-Fall 1976.

External links

 http://hdl.loc.gov/loc.pnp/hhh.ma0487
 https://www.flickr.com/photos/boston_public_library/5415294659/
 Old West Church web site

Churches completed in 1806
Asher Benjamin buildings
Churches in Boston
National Historic Landmarks in Boston
Towers in Massachusetts
Clock towers in Massachusetts
West End, Boston
Churches on the National Register of Historic Places in Massachusetts
Historic district contributing properties in Massachusetts
National Register of Historic Places in Boston